William Henry Short VC (4 February 1884 – 6 August 1916) was an English recipient of the Victoria Cross, the highest and most prestigious award for gallantry in the face of the enemy that can be awarded to British and Commonwealth forces.

Short was from Eston, Middlesbrough. Before the war he was a steelworker, working as a craneman in a steelworks at Eston. He was also a popular local footballer, playing for the Grangetown Albion, Saltburn, and Lazenby United.

He was 31 years old, and a private in the 8th Battalion, Yorkshire Regiment (Alexandra, Princess of Wales's Own), (Green Howards) British Army during the First World War.

On 6 August 1916 at Munster Alley, Contalmaison, France, during the Battle of the Somme, for which he was awarded the VC. 

Short was interred at Contalmaison Chateau Cemetery, France. The gravestone inscription reads: SAFE WITH JESUS NEVER FORGOTTEN BY MOTHER FATHER, BROTHERS & SISTERS TILL WE MEET AGAIN. His Victoria Cross is displayed at the Green Howards Museum, Richmond, North Yorkshire, England. His steel helmet is part of the collection of the Imperial War Museum.

References

Monuments to Courage (David Harvey, 1999)
The Register of the Victoria Cross (This England, 1997)
VCs of the First World War - The Somme (Gerald Gliddon, 1994)

External links
Biography

1884 births
1916 deaths
Green Howards soldiers
British Army personnel of World War I
British Battle of the Somme recipients of the Victoria Cross
British military personnel killed in the Battle of the Somme
People from Eston
British Army recipients of the Victoria Cross
Military personnel from Yorkshire